The Ireland women's cricket team toured England in July 2010. They played England in one One Day International, which was won by England. They also played against New Zealand in one ODI, as part of New Zealand's tour of England, which was won by New Zealand.

Squads

Only ODI: Ireland v New Zealand

Tour match: Marylebone Cricket Club v Ireland

Only ODI: England v Ireland

References

External links
Ireland Women tour of England 2010 from Cricinfo

England 2010
Ire
2010 in Irish cricket
Women's cricket tours of England
cricket